Calcutta is an unincorporated community in Pleasants County, West Virginia, United States. It is named after the city of Calcutta (now Kolkata, former capital of British India) in India.

References

Unincorporated communities in Pleasants County, West Virginia
Unincorporated communities in West Virginia